The Baghdad School, also known as the  Arab school, was a relatively short-lived yet influential school of Islamic art developed during the late 12th century in the capital Baghdad of the ruling Abbasid Caliphate. The movement had largely died out by the early 14th century, five decades following the invasion of the Mongols in 1258 and the downfall of the Abbasids' rule, and would eventually be replaced by stylistic movements from the Mongol tradition.  The Baghdad School is particularly noted for its distinctive approach to manuscript illustration.  The faces depicted in illustrations were individualized and expressive, with the scenes often highlighting realistic features of everyday life from the period.  This stylistic movement used strong, bright colors, and employed a balanced sense of design and a decorative quality, with illustrations often lacking traditional frames and appearing between lines of text on manuscript pages.

Background
The Baghdad School of art is noted for its manuscript artwork. The school consisted of calligraphers, illustrators, transcribers and translators, who collaborated to produce illuminated manuscripts derived from non-Arabic sources. The characteristic Baghdad School artistic style, which features sprightly characters bearing highly expressive faces and hand gestures (rather than stereotypical people), reached its peak in the first half of the 13th-century, although some examples can be identified at earlier periods.  Illustrations in this style represent a skilful blend of Byzantine, Persian and Arab features. 

Very few illuminated copies of the Qu'ran from this period have survived, but a number of secular manuscripts are still extant. These manuscripts are primarily scientific treatises or social commentaries. 

The descriptor, "Baghdad School", was coined by the French Orientalist, Eustache De Lorey, in 1938, when he curated an exhibition of illustrations from Maqamat Badi' az-Zaman al-Hamadhani for the Bibliothèque nationale de France. Some art historians and curators used the term, Mesopotamian School, while other scholars have suggested that the term should be replaced with something broader, such as the Arab School of Miniatures, because its exponents were not just confined to Baghdad and Iraq.

Translations and illustrations of De Materia Medica

The Greek materia medica, in particular herbals and bestiaries, which described the characteristics and medicinal uses of various plants and animals found in the Mediterranean world, were among the books transcribed.  Several Arabic translations of Dioscorides' work, De Materia Medica have been discovered. Dioscorides' treatise was considered especially important, and remains one of the best examples of manuscript translation and illustration produced by the Baghdad School. Dioscorides was a renowned Greek physician, herbalist, and pharmacist serving the Roman Empire and its armies during the first century CE, whose work gained influence throughout the medieval Islamic world.

Of these, a manuscript known as the Mashhad Manuscript, originally believed to be 13th-century  work, has been reassessed and now dated to between 1152 and 1176, providing one of the earliest examples of illustrations in the style of the Baghdad School. Another early example of these translations is the translation and work probably by Abdallah ibn al-Fadl. The illustrations were considered especially important, and it remains one of the best examples of manuscript translation and illustration produced by the Baghdad School.  Dioscorides was a renowned Greek physician, herbalist, and pharmacist serving the Roman Empire and its armies during the first century CE, whose work gained influence throughout the medieval Islamic world. 

Among the illustrated manuscript leaves of the 13th-century Dioscorides' Materia Medica is the page entitled, “Physician Preparing an Elixir," also referred to by The Heilbrunn Timeline of Art History as “Preparation of Medicine from Honey.”  It is dated 1224 CE and was found in Iraq or Northern Jazira, possibly Baghdad.  The page depicts an illustration of a bearded physician with a colorful blue headscarf and red clothing seated on an ornamental stool.  He is mixing a yellow pot with a ladle while overlooking a yellow cauldron hanging from a red tripod above a wide blue container.  His other hand is raised up towards his mouth.  A large blue jug lies to the left of the tripod.  Two overhanging trees on either side of the scene bear leaves and two different types of what appear to be colorful fruit or flowers—red on the left and yellow on the right.  The ground below the scene is covered with green grass, however there is no background depicted in the illustration thus reducing the sense of depth. The style of illustration depicted on this manuscript leaf is thus an excellent example of the Baghdad School: the colors are bright and distinctive, the objects depicted in the scene have a balanced, symmetrical design with the trees framing the illustration, and finally, the man's face appears to be in a state of deep, expressive contemplation.  The scene itself has a realistic and personalized quality to it, depicting a physician in a natural setting as he prepares a medicinal mixture containing honey for his patients, and yet also has ornamental characteristics with its design and choice of colors—another distinctive feature of the Baghdad School.

'Illustrations and text from the 13th-century Arabic translation of De Materia MedicaTranscription and illustration of Maqamat
The Abbasid artist, Yahya Al-Wasiti, who probably lived in Baghdad in the late Abbasid era (12th to 13th-centuries), was one of the pre-eminent exponents of the Baghdad school. In 1236-37, he is known to have transcribed and illustrated the book, Maqamat (also known as the Assemblies or the Sessions), a series of anecdotes of social satire written by Al-Hariri of Basra. The narrative concerns the travels of a middle-aged man as he uses his charm and eloquence to swindle his way across the Arabic world.Illustrations by Yahya Al-Wasiti from al-Hariri's Maqamat 'Other works 

Yet other examples of work in the style of the Baghdad School include the illustrations in Kalila wa Dimna (Fables of Bidpai), (1222); a collection of fables by the Hindu, Bidpai translated into Arabic, and Rasa'il al-Ikhwan al-Safa (The Epistles of the Sincere Brethren) (1287); an example of an illuminated manuscript produced after the Mongol invasion.

Legacy
In the 20th-century, al-Waiti's illustrations and the Baghdad School served as an inspiration for The Baghdad Modern Art Group. Founded in the 1950s by artists, Jawad Saleem and Shakir Hassan Al Said, members of the group believed that the Mongol invasion of the 13th-century represented a "break in the chain of pictorial Iraqi art" and wanted to reassert a national identity and build a distinctive Iraqi identity which referenced heritage and tradition. As the leader of the group, Saleem promoted the idea of istilham al-turath'' – "seeking inspiration from tradition".

See also
Arabic miniature
Arabic literature
Culture of Iraq
Hurufiyya movement 
Islamic art
Islamic calligraphy
Islamic Golden Age  
Iraqi art
List of Iraqi artists

References

Art movements
Arabic art
Islamic illuminated manuscripts
Iraqi art